He's on Duty is a 2010 South Korean 2010 black comedy film that comically yet incisively depicts racial issues in Korea. Tae-sik finds it difficult to get a job due to his odd appearance and impatient character. After failing repeatedly, he disguises himself as a foreigner and finally lands a job. Tae-sik, however, witnesses the cruel treatment migrant workers face in Korea.

The Korean title is a pun on the lead character's name and is an abbreviated form of 반갑습니다 (bangabseumnida) or 반가워요 (bangawoyo) which translates to "Delighted? Delighted!" or "Nice to meet you."

Plot
Bang Tae-sik is perennially unemployed as he drifts from one job to another, from manual labor to serving coffee. His appearance (dark skin and short height), being rather atypical for a Korean is to blame it seems, but best buddy Yong-cheol persuades Tae-sik to make better use of these disadvantages: Desperate and having nothing better to do, he adopts a strange accent and ethnic hat and is reborn as Bang-ga (a twist on his family name) from Bhutan, and immediately lands a job at a chair manufacturing factory.

Despite a shaky beginning ― due to his unredeemable clumsiness, rather than doubts about his alleged Bhutani roots that are all too convincing ― Tae-sik gets along with his co-workers, and even starts romancing the lovely Jang-mi from Vietnam. He is even voted to become president of a migrant workers labor union and competent Korean language instructor, and joins in a harmonious effort to win a local singing competition for foreigners.

Tae-sik begins to truly bond with his co-workers but his loyalties are put to the test when Yong-cheol finds a way to swindle their money.

Cast
Kim In-kwon as Bang Tae-sik / Bang-ga
Kim Jung-tae as Yong-cheol 
Shin Hyun-bin as Jang-mi 
Khan Mohammad Asaduzzman as Ali 
Nazarudin as Rajah 
Peter Holman as Charlie 
Eshonkulov Parviz as Michael 
Jeon Gook-hwan as Boss Hwang 
Kim Kang-hee as Miss Hong 
Kim Bo-min as Hye-young 
Park Yeong-soo as Park Kwan-sang
Jung Tae-won as Dan-poong

Awards and nominations
2010 Korean Film Awards
Nomination - Best Supporting Actor: Kim Jung-tae
Nomination - Best New Actress: Shin Hyun-bin
Nomination - Best Screenplay: Yook Sang-hyo
Nomination - Best Music: Shin Hyung

2011 Baeksang Arts Awards
Best New Actress: Shin Hyun-bin
Best Screenplay: Yook Sang-hyo

2011 Buil Film Awards
Best Screenplay: Yook Sang-hyo

References

External links
 

2010s Korean-language films
2010 black comedy films
South Korean black comedy films
Films about immigration
Films about racism
2010s South Korean films